Kazeruni may refer to:

 Old Kazeruni language, an extinct Iranian language of Kazeruni people
 Kazeruni, an Iranian family name; an inhabitant of Kazerun or its present Persian dialect
 Abul Ishaq Ibrahim Kazeruni, a Sufi
 Sadid al-Din Muhammad ibn Mas‘ud Kazerouni an Iranian 14th century physician